KCMY (1300 AM with translator K273AF at 102.5 FM serving Reno) is a radio station broadcasting a classic country format, branding itself as "Cowboy Country". Licensed to Carson City, Nevada, United States, the station is currently owned by The Evans Broadcasting Company, Inc. and features programming from Fox News Radio, as well as local news. The station's transmitter is located in Carson City.

External links
KCMY Facebook Page
FCC History Cards for KCMY

CMY
CMY